David J. Morris (1888 – after 1911) was an English professional footballer who played in the Football League for Birmingham. Born in Walsall, Staffordshire, Morris joined Birmingham in 1910, and made his debut in the Second Division on 9 September 1911 in a 2–1 defeat at Fulham. Morris played on the losing side in the next two games, looked out of his depth, and returned to non-league football in 1912.

References

1888 births
Year of death missing
Sportspeople from Walsall
English footballers
Association football forwards
Darlaston Town F.C. players
Birmingham City F.C. players
Tipton Town F.C. players
English Football League players
Date of birth missing
Place of death missing